Adriaan Marie Anne van der Willigen (26 February 1910, The Hague – 29 May 1986, The Hague) was a Dutch philatelist who was added to the Roll of Distinguished Philatelists in 1973. He had a master's degree in economics and was a civil servant at the Ministry of Economic Affairs.

References

1910 births
1986 deaths
Dutch philatelists
Fellows of the Royal Philatelic Society London
Signatories to the Roll of Distinguished Philatelists
People from The Hague